Lunar: Silver Star Harmony,  known in Japan as  is the third remake of the 1992 role-playing video game Lunar: The Silver Star. It was developed by Game Arts in 2009 and released exclusively for the PlayStation Portable by GungHo Works in Japan, by Xseed Games North America, and by Game Arts in Europe and Australia (PSN only).

Gameplay
Lunar: Silver Star Harmony is a traditional, top-down role-playing video game featuring two-dimensional character and background graphics.  While it retains the animated cutscenes from Lunar: Silver Star Story Complete, it features a new isometric view, a hand-drawn style for the characters and backgrounds, a more talkative lead character, a remixed soundtrack, new voice-acting and a new English localization. The gameplay itself remains the same, although it incorporates improvements from Lunar 2: Eternal Blue Complete as well as ultimate attacks akin of Final Fantasy VII'''s Limit Breaks.

Plot
The story of Lunar: Silver Star Harmony is identical to Lunar: Silver Star Story Complete, with the exception of an additional short playable prologue featuring the original Four Heroes (Dragonmaster Dyne, Ghaleon, Mel D'Alkirk and Lemia Ausa) and their final fight against dark wizard Eiphel and his allies, the Five Princes of the Black Star, who have abducted the previous incarnation of the Goddess Althena.

Release

Xseed Games acquired the publishing rights of Lunar: Silver Star Harmony'' for North America; originally set to be released on February 12, 2010, the game was later delayed until February 23, then March 2. At release, a limited edition of the game was also available, which includes a soundtrack CD and full set of bromides featuring the female characters.

Reception

Notes

References

External links
 
  
 Lunar: Silver Star Harmony at GameFAQs

Role-playing video games
PlayStation Portable-only games
Lunar (series)
Video game remakes
2009 video games
PlayStation Portable games
Video games developed in Japan
Video games scored by Noriyuki Iwadare
Xseed Games games
Single-player video games
Game Arts games